Elmastaşoğlu is a Turkish surname. Notable people with the name include:
Nail Elmastaşoğlu (born 1933), Turkish football forward
Ayhan Elmastaşoğlu (born 1941), Turkish football midfielder
Ayfer Elmastaşoğlu (born 1944), Turkish football midfielder and manager

See also

Turkish-language surnames